Patrick Henry Kelley (October 7, 1867 – September 11, 1925) was a politician from the U.S. state of Michigan. He served as U.S. Representative from Michigan's 6th congressional district from 1915 to 1923.

Biography
Kelley was born in Silver Creek Township, Cass County, Michigan, near Dowagiac.  In 1875, he moved to Berrien County with his parents, who settled in Watervliet. He attended the district and village schools and in 1887 graduated from the Northern Indiana Normal School in Valparaiso. He taught school at Fair Plain in Berrien County for several years. He attended the Michigan State Normal School at Ypsilanti (now Eastern Michigan University) and then graduated from the law department of the University of Michigan at Ann Arbor in 1900. He was admitted to the bar the same year, commenced practice in Lansing and was a law partner  with Seymour H. Person.

Kelley served as a member of the State board of education 1901–1905, as the state superintendent of public instruction 1905–1907, and as the 33rd lieutenant governor of Michigan 1907-1911 serving under Governor Fred M. Warner. In 1912, he was elected as a Republican to the Sixty-third United States Congress as an at-large candidate  for an increase in Michigan's Congressional delegation as a result of the 1910 census, technically becoming the first to represent the 13th district.  He was then re-elected to the four succeeding Congresses from Michigan's 6th congressional district.

In 1922, Kelley did not seek renomination, but was an unsuccessful candidate for election to the United States Senate, losing in the Republican primary to Charles E. Townsend. He resumed the practice of law in Lansing. He died while on a visit to Washington, D.C. and is interred in Mount Hope Cemetery in Lansing.

References

The Political Graveyard

External links

1867 births
1925 deaths
Lieutenant Governors of Michigan
Valparaiso University alumni
Eastern Michigan University alumni
People from Cass County, Michigan
Michigan Superintendents of Public Instruction
Burials in Michigan
University of Michigan Law School alumni
Republican Party members of the United States House of Representatives from Michigan
20th-century American politicians